The Mohan Nagar metro station is located on the Red Line of the Delhi Metro. It is located in the Sahibabad Industrial Area locality of Ghaziabad of Uttar Pradesh. It is one of main and busiest metro station of Ghaziabad and also the future connectivity with Vaishali Blue line metro is Proposed. Situated Right next to important Malls, Hospital, colleges and Industrial area which gives this metro station an extra importance. People going to anand Vihar or Vaishali can take Bus from outside the metro station also auto rickshaw to various places of Ghaziabad and Dilshad Garden is available from here.

History
This station was proposed early in 2016 by DMRC under extension of Red line. The project deadline was 30 September 2018, when trials were to be conducted. The final commencement was done on 8 March 2019 and the metro station (including the whole new branch of Red Line) has been opened for all commercial passengers on 9 March 2019, Saturday from 0800 hours.

Station layout

Facilities
Word Square Mall and Narinder Mohan Cancer Hospital are nearby.
I.T.S College Mohan Nagar, Anand Industrial Area, and Shiva temple can be easily reached from here.

See also
List of Delhi Metro stations
Transport in Delhi
Delhi Metro Rail Corporation
Delhi Suburban Railway
List of rapid transit systems in India
Delhi Transport Corporation
List of Metro Systems
National Capital Region (India)
Ghaziabad district, Uttar Pradesh

References

External links

 Delhi Metro Rail Corporation Ltd. (Official site)
 Delhi Metro Annual Reports
 
 UrbanRail.Net – descriptions of all metro systems in the world, each with a schematic map showing all stations.

Delhi Metro stations
 Railway stations in Ghaziabad district, India